The 1952 Big Ten Conference football season was the 57th season of college football played by the member schools of the Big Ten Conference (also known as the Western Conference and the Big Nine Conference) and was a part of the 1952 college football season.

The 1952 Wisconsin Badgers football team, under head coach Ivy Williamson, compiled a 6–3–1 record, tied for the Big Ten championship, was ranked No. 10 in the final UP poll and No. 11 in the final AP poll, and lost to USC in the 1953 Rose Bowl. Tackle Dave Suminski was the team's only first-team All-American and was selected as the team's most valuable player. Sophomore Alan Ameche was a first-team All-Big Ten player, set a Wisconsin record with 946 rushing yards, and went on to win the 1954 Heisman Trophy.

The 1952 Purdue Boilermakers football team, under head coach Stu Holcomb, was the Big Ten co-champion and ranked No. 12 in the final UP poll and No. 18 in the final AP poll. Purdue end Bernie Flowers was the Big Ten's only consensus first-team All-American in 1952 and was the first Big Ten player selected in the 1953  NFL Draft. Dale Samuels was the first Purdue quarterback to pass for over 1,000 yards in a season.

The conference's statistical leaders included Illinois quarterback Tommy O'Connell with 1,761 passing yards and 1,724 yards of total offense, Alan Ameche with 946 rushing yards, and Indiana's Gene Gedman with 54 points scored.

Season overview

Results and team statistics

Key
AP final = Team's rank in the final AP Poll of the 1952 season
AP high = Team's highest rank in the AP Poll throughout the 1952 season
PPG = Average of points scored per game; conference leader's average displayed in bold
PAG = Average of points allowed per game; conference leader's average displayed in bold
MVP = Most valuable player as voted by players on each team as part of the voting process to determine the winner of the Chicago Tribune Silver Football trophy; trophy winner in bold

Preseason

Regular season

September 27
 Wisconsin 42, Marquette 19.
 Ohio State 33, Indiana 13.
 Purdue 20, Penn State 20.
 Michigan State 27, Michigan 13.

October 4
 Wisconsin 20, Illinois 6.
 Purdue 21, Ohio State 14.
 Stanford 14, Michigan 7.

October 11
 Ohio State 23, Wisconsin 14.
 Purdue 41, Iowa 14.
 Michigan 28, Indiana 13.

October 18
 Wisconsin 42, Iowa 13.
 Ohio State 35, Washington State 7.
 Notre Dame 26, Purdue 14.
 Michigan 48, Northwestern 14.

October 25
 UCLA 20, Wisconsin 7.
 Iowa 8, Ohio State 0.
 Purdue 40, Illinois 12.
 Michigan 21, Minnesota 0.

November 1
 Wisconsin 21, Rice 7.
 Ohio State 24, Northwestern 21.
 Michigan State 14, Purdue 7.
 Illinois 22, Michigan 13.

November 8
 Wisconsin 24, Northwestern 20.
 Pittsburgh 21, Ohio State 14.
 Minnesota 14, Purdue 14.
 Michigan 49, Cornell 7.

November 15
 Wisconsin 37, Indiana 14.
 Ohio State 27, Illinois 7.
 Michigan 21, Purdue 10.

November 22
 Minnesota 21, Wisconsin 21.
 Ohio State 27, Michigan 7.
 Purdue 21, Indiana 16.

Bowl games

Post-season developments

Awards and honors

All-Big Ten honors

The following players were picked by the Associated Press (AP)as first-team players on the 1952 All-Big Ten Conference football team. The AP picked separate offensive and defensive units, whereas the UP selected a single, eleven man unit.

AP offense and UP overall selections

AP defensive unit

All-American honors

At the end of the 1952 season, only one Big Ten player secured a consensus first-team pick on the 1952 College Football All-America Team. The Big Ten's consensus All-Americans were:

Other Big Ten players who were named first-team All-Americans by at least one selector were:

Other awards

Minnesota running back Paul Giel finished third in the voting for the 1952 Heisman Trophy.

1953 NFL Draft
The following Big Ten players were among the first 100 picks in the 1953 NFL Draft:

References